Chestnut Ridge is an unincorporated community in Monongalia County, West Virginia, United States, adjacent to the city of Morgantown.

References 

Unincorporated communities in West Virginia
Unincorporated communities in Monongalia County, West Virginia